In organosulfur chemistry, thioacetals are the sulfur (thio-) analogues of acetals.

The symmetric dithioacetals are relatively common. They are prepared by condensation of thiols or dithiols (two  groups) with aldehydes.  These reactions proceed via the intermediacy of hemithioacetals:
Thiol addition to give hemithioacetal:
RSH + R'CH(O) -> R'CH(SR)OH
Thiol addition with loss of water to give dithioacetal: 
RSH + R'CH(OH)SR -> R'CH(SR)2 + H2O
Such reactions typically employ either a Lewis acid or Brønsted acid as catalyst.

Dithioacetals generated from aldehydes and either 1,2-ethanedithiol or 1,3-propanedithiol are especially common among this class of molecules for use in organic synthesis.

The carbonyl carbon of an aldehyde is electrophilic and therefore susceptible to attack by nucleophiles, whereas the analogous central carbon of a dithioacetal is not electrophilic. As a result, dithioacetals can serve as protective groups for aldehydes. 

Far from being unreactive, and in a reaction unlike that of aldehydes, that carbon can be deprotonated to render it nucleophilic:

R'CHS2C2H4 + R2NLi -> R'CLiS2C2H4 + R2NH

The reaction is commonly performed using the 1,3-dithiane. The lithiated intermediate can be used for various nucleophilic bond-forming reactions, and then the dithioketal hydrolyzed back to its carbonyl form. This overall process, the Corey–Seebach reaction, gives the synthetic equivalent of an acyl anion.

See also
 Mozingo reduction
 Thioketal

References

Functional groups
Organosulfur compounds